Rachel Kohl Finegold (born 1980) is a Montreal-based Open Orthodox Rabba at Congregation Shaar Haashomayim, and the first Orthodox woman to serve as synagogue clergy in Canada.

Biography
Kohl Finegold grew up in Brooklyn, New York, before attending Boston University, where in 2003 she earned a B.A. in Religion with a minor in Psychology. In 2007, she received a certificate from the Drisha Institute for Jewish Education in New York. She interned at the Ohev Sholom Synagogue in Washington, D.C., before spending six years as Education and Ritual Director at Anshe Sholom B'nai Israel in Chicago. In June 2013, she was one of the first three women to graduate from Yeshiva Maharat, a four-year program in The Bronx that ordains Orthodox women as spiritual leaders. 

In August 2013, Kohl Finegold became the Director of Education and Spiritual Enrichment at Congregation Shaar Hashomayim in Montreal, the largest and oldest traditional Ashkenazi synagogue in Canada. In doing so, she also became the first Orthodox woman to serve as synagogue clergy in Canada.  In 2019, she changed her title from Maharat to Rabba. Since 2019 she has been the president of the Montreal Board of Rabbis, and since 2020 she has served as Vice President of the International Rabbinic Fellowship. In 2022, Kohl Finegold created the podcast Verses, which draws links between Broadway and Torah.

Kohl Finegold lives in Westmount with her husband Rabbi Avi Finegold and their three children.

References 

1980 births
Living people
Boston University alumni
Canadian Orthodox Jews
Open Orthodox Jews
Orthodox Jewish feminists
People from Montreal
Orthodox women rabbis
People from Brooklyn